Valentin Tournet (born 1996) is a French conductor, choral conductor and viola da gamba player.

Early life and education
Born near Paris in 1996, he started the viola da gamba at the age of 5 following the shock of listening to the music of the movie Tous les Matins du Monde. He entered the Royal Conservatory of Brussels to study with Philippe Pierlot, then the Conservatoire de Paris with Christophe Coin and also receive advice from Jordi Savall.

He won first prizes (viola da gamba and chamber music) at the age of 14.

He participated in the children's choir of the Paris Opera and learned conducting with Pierre Cao. He met Philippe Herreweghe at the Festival de Saintes where his family comes from.

Career
He made his debut in 2015 at the MAfestival Brugge and at the Festival Oude Muziek.

In 2017, during his studies at the Paris Conservatory, Valentin Tournet created the ensemble "La Chapelle Harmonique", a choir and a period-instrument orchestra and gave the first concerts at the Royal Chapel of the Palace of Versailles.

Hailed by the international media and audiences as a “mature“ conductor who holds a “natural authority“, his performances of Bach sacred works are claimed as a “perfect balance between flesh and spirit“.

He is an artist in residence at the Fondation Singer-Polignac, then at the Festival d'Auvers-sur-Oise.

His meeting with the composer Thierry Escaich gives rise to a collaboration in 2018.

Discography 

 BACH, J.S. - Magnificat BWV 243a - Cantate BWV 63 - La Chapelle Harmonique - Château de Versailles Spectacles

References

External links
 Portrait of Valentin Tournet on La Croix
 Website of La Chapelle Harmonique

French performers of early music
1996 births
Musicians from Paris
Living people
Royal Conservatory of Brussels alumni
Conservatoire de Paris alumni
French classical musicians
French choral conductors
French male conductors (music)
Viol players
People from La Garenne-Colombes
21st-century French conductors (music)
21st-century French male musicians